Edwin Frederick Weigle (March 13, 1889 – August 1, 1973) was a cameraman for the Chicago Tribune, cinematographer and documentary film maker.

Biography
Weigle was born in Chicago, Illinois on March 13, 1889. His parents Adolph and Sophie came from Germany and emigrated to the United States in 1879. 

Weigle worked for the Chicago Tribune from 1909 and achieved prominence as a film correspondent during the First World War. Shortly after the outbreak of the war, Weigle covered the resistance of the Belgian army against the German invaders. Weigle obtained permission from the Belgian government to photograph actual battle scenes for the first time. The result was On Belgian Battlefields, one of the first war documentaries shown in the United States. In 1915 and 1916, the Chicago Tribune again sent Weigle to Europe where he shot film on the Western and Eastern Front for The German Side of the War. 

After the American entry in the war, Weigle joined the U.S. Signal Corps, and filmed with the 35th Division in France during the Meuse-Argonne Offensive. 

Edwin Weigle retired as a film correspondent shortly after the war and died in Deerfield, Illinois, on August 1, 1973.

Film work

Segments from Weigle's war footage have been identified and located by authors Cooper C. Graham and Ron van Dopperen while researching their book American Cinematographers in the Great War, 1914-1918.   A short scene showing the burning city of Alost from Weigle's film On Belgian Battlefields (USA, 1914) was located by the authors in the collection of the Belgian film archives. At the Library of Congress numerous segments were found from Weigle's film The German Side of the War (USA, 1915/1916). Scenes taken by Weigle in June 1918 at an artillery school in Fort Sill, Oklahoma, were retrieved by the authors in the collection of the National Archives. The authors also found this World War I Western Front footage at the Imperial War Museum, shot by Weigle with the 35th Division in France shortly after the battle of Meuse-Argonne in October 1918. 

In 2017, Weigle's original combat camera  - a Bell & Howell 2709 - that he cranked while filming with the 35th Division, A.E.F, at the Western Front was discovered by the authors in the historical collection of a movie prop house. 

Weigle's film work during World War I featured in the documentary Mobilizing Movies! The U.S. Signal Corps Goes to War, 1917-1919.

Sources 

 Cooper C. Graham and Ron van Dopperen, "Edwin F. Weigle: Cameraman for the Chicago Tribune", Film History vol. 22 (2010), 389-407, https://muse.jhu.edu/article/411651

 James W. Castellan, Ron van Dopperen, Cooper C. Graham, American Cinematographers in the Great War, 1914-1918 (New Barnet 2014) https://doi.org/10.2307%2Fj.ctt1bmzn8c

 Edwin F. Weigle, My Experiences on the Belgian Battlefields (First Edition, Chicago 1914) PDF

 Edwin F. Weigle, On Four Battle-Fronts with the German Army (Chicago 1915) PDF 

 "Mobilizing Movies! The U.S. Signal Corps Goes To War, 1917-1919" (documentary, 2017) 

 "Photographic Activities U.S. Signal Corps During World War I" (Reconstructed 2018) 

 Movie Trailer "American Cinematographers in the Great War, 1914-1918"

References 

American documentary filmmakers
American male journalists
Writers from Chicago
1889 births
1973 deaths
Chicago Tribune people
war photography
20th-century American photographers
 American war photographers
American photojournalists
World War I photographers
People from Chicago